Sir Samuel Edward Scott, 6th Baronet (25 October 1873 – 21 February 1943) was a British Conservative Party politician.

Political career 
He was elected unopposed as Member of Parliament (MP) for the Marylebone West at a by-election in February 1898 after his predecessor (and stepfather) Sir Horace Farquhar was elevated to the peerage as Baron Farquhar. He held the seat for over 20 years until the constituency was abolished at the 1918 general election.

He was then elected unopposed as the Coalition Conservative MP for the new St Marylebone constituency. He retired from politics at the 1922 general election.

In April 1901 he was appointed an Assistant Private Secretary (unpaid) to Lord Stanley, Financial Secretary to the War Office.

Military career
Scott was a Lieutenant in the Royal Horse Guards. He resigned from his commission, and was appointed a second-lieutenant in the West Kent Yeomanry (Queen's Own) on 24 February 1897. Following the outbreak of the Second Boer War, he volunteered for active service with the Imperial Yeomanry, and was on 10 February 1900 appointed a lieutenant in the 11th Battalion. While seconded, he was promoted to a lieutenant in the West Kent Yeomanry on 2 August 1902.

References

External links 
 

1873 births
1943 deaths
Conservative Party (UK) MPs for English constituencies
UK MPs 1895–1900
UK MPs 1900–1906
UK MPs 1906–1910
UK MPs 1910
UK MPs 1910–1918
UK MPs 1918–1922
Queen's Own West Kent Yeomanry officers
British Army personnel of the Second Boer War
Baronets in the Baronetage of the United Kingdom
Royal Horse Guards officers
Imperial Yeomanry officers